Polyclathra is a genus of the gourd family. It has the synonyms Pentaclathra, Pittiera, and Roseanthus. Its corolla is white.

Species

References

External links 

Cucurbitaceae genera
Cucurbitoideae